Maria Sharapova was the defending champion, but lost to Martina Hingis in the semifinal.

Elena Dementieva won the title, defeating Hingis in the final 6–2, 6–0.

Seeds

Draw

Finals

Top half

Bottom half

References
 Main Draw

2006 Singles
Toray Pan Pacific Open - Singles
2006 Toray Pan Pacific Open